The 1981 Davidson Wildcats football team represented Davidson College as a member of the Southern Conference during the 1981 NCAA Division I-AA football season. Led by eighth-year head coach Ed Farrell, the Wildcats compiled an overall record of 4–6.

Schedule

References

Davidson
Davidson Wildcats football seasons
Davidson Wildcats football